Chet Phillips (October 23, 1913 – October 7, 1988) was an American gymnast. He competed in eight events at the 1936 Summer Olympics.

References

External links
 

1913 births
1988 deaths
American male artistic gymnasts
Olympic gymnasts of the United States
Gymnasts at the 1936 Summer Olympics
Gymnasts from Philadelphia